Vasili Alekseyevich Chernov (born 26 May 1982) is a former Russian professional football player.

Club career
He played in the Russian Football National League for FC Rotor Volgograd in 2010.

References

External links
 

1982 births
People from Kamyshin
Living people
Russian footballers
Association football defenders
FC Olimpia Volgograd players
FC Mordovia Saransk players
FC Rotor Volgograd players
FC Mashuk-KMV Pyatigorsk players
Sportspeople from Volgograd Oblast